Monroe Historic District may refer to:

Monroe Center Historic District, Monroe, Connecticut
Monroe Commercial Historic District, Monroe, Georgia
Monroe and Walton Mills Historic District, Monroe, Georgia
Monroe Residential Historic District (Monroe, Louisiana), listed on the NRHP in Ouachita Parish
Village of Monroe Historic District, Monroe, New York, also known as the Smith's Mill Historic District 
Monroe Downtown Historic District, Monroe, Union County, North Carolina
Monroe Residential Historic District (Monroe, North Carolina), Monroe, Union County, North Carolina
Monroe Courts Historic District, Arlington County, Virginia

See also
Monroe Center (disambiguation)
Monroe Residential Historic District (disambiguation)
Jackson–Monroe Terraces Historic District, Gary, Indiana
Monroe Terrace Historic District, Gary, Indiana
South Monroe Street Historic District, Coldwater, Michigan
Monroe Avenue Commercial Buildings, Detroit, Michigan
Monroe Street East Historic District, Wheeling, Ohio County, West Virginia